The  was a genre and type of early modern Japanese novel. It came into being late in the Edo period during the 19th century. As a genre, it depicted the comical behavior occurring in commoners' daily lives.

The kokkeibon genre is the successor of the dangibon genre. Jippensha Ikku's Tōkaidōchū Hizakurige (1802–1822) is identified as the first representative novel. A less strict definition includes the dangibon as an "early kokkeibon".

Kokkeibon generally consists of dialogue among the main characters and includes illustrations. The genre was most popular between 1804 and 1830, and is most representative by the works of Jippensha Ikku and Shikitei Sanba.

See also
Gesaku

References
 
 

 
Edo-period works
Gesaku
Japanese literature